Members of the Queen's Privy Council for Canada appointed between 1968 and 2005.

By Ministry

P. E. Trudeau
The Honourable Donald Stovel Macdonald (from April 20, 1968)
The Honourable John Carr Munro (from April 20, 1968)
The Honourable Gérard Pelletier (from April 20, 1968)
The Honourable John (Jack) Davis (from April 26, 1968)
The Honourable Horace Andrew Olson (from July 6, 1968)
The Honourable John-Eudes Dubé (from July 6, 1968)
The Honourable Stanley Ronald Basford (from July 6, 1968)
The Honourable Donald Campbell Jamieson (from July 6, 1968)
The Honourable Eric William Kierans (from July 6, 1968)
The Honourable Robert Knight Andras (from July 6, 1968)
The Honourable James Armstrong Richardson (from July 6, 1968)
The Honourable Otto Emil Lang (from July 6, 1968)
The Honourable Sydney John Smith (from October 10, 1968)
The Right Honourable Herbert Eser Gray (from October 20, 1969)
The Honourable Robert Douglas George Stanbury (from October 20, 1969)
The Right Honourable J.H. Gérald Fauteux (from March 23, 1970)
The Honourable Jean-Pierre Goyer (from December 22, 1970)
The Honourable Alastair Gillespie (from August 12, 1971)
The Honourable Martin Patrick O'Connell (from August 12, 1971)
The Honourable Pat Mahoney (from January 28, 1972)
The Honourable Stanley Haidasz (from November 27, 1972)
The Honourable Eugene Francis Whelan (from November 27, 1972)
The Honourable William Warren Allmand (from November 27, 1972)
The Honourable James Hugh Faulkner (from November 27, 1972)
The Honourable André Ouellet (from November 27, 1972)
The Honourable Daniel Joseph MacDonald (from November 27, 1972)
The Honourable Marc Lalonde (from November 27, 1972)
The Right Honourable Jeanne Mathilde Sauvé (from November 27, 1972)
The Right Honourable Bora Laskin (from January 7, 1974)
The Honourable Lucien Lamoureux (from June 10, 1974)
The Honourable Raymond Joseph Perrault (from August 8, 1974)
The Honourable Barnett Jerome Danson (from August 8, 1974)
The Honourable J. Judd Buchanan (from August 8, 1974)
The Right Honourable Roméo A. LeBlanc (from August 8, 1974)
The Honourable Muriel McQueen Fergusson (from November 7, 1974)
The Honourable Pierre Juneau (from August 29, 1975)
The Honourable Marcel Lessard (from September 26, 1975)
The Honourable Jack Sydney George Cullen (from September 26, 1975)
The Honourable Leonard Stephen Marchand (from September 15, 1976)
The Honourable John Roberts (from September 15, 1976)
The Honourable Monique Bégin (from September 15, 1976)
The Honourable Jean-Jacques Blais (from September 15, 1976)
The Honourable Francis Fox (from September 15, 1976)
The Honourable Anthony Chisholm Abbott (from September 15, 1976)
The Honourable Iona Campagnolo (from September 15, 1976)
The Honourable Joseph-Philippe Guay (from November 3, 1976)
The Honourable John Henry Horner (from April 21, 1977)
The Honourable Norman A. Cafik (from September 16, 1977)
The Honourable J. Gilles Lamontagne (from January 19, 1978)
The Honourable John Mercer Reid (from November 24, 1978)
The Honourable Pierre de Bané (from November 24, 1978)
The Right Honourable Jules Léger (from June 1, 1979)

Clark
The Right Honourable Charles Joseph Clark (from June 4, 1979)
The Honourable Walter David Baker (from June 4, 1979)
The Honourable Flora Isabel MacDonald (from June 4, 1979)
The Honourable James Aloysius McGrath (from June 4, 1979)
The Honourable Erik H. Nielsen (from June 4, 1979)
The Honourable Allan Frederick Lawrence (from June 4, 1979)
The Honourable John Carnell Crosbie (from June 4, 1979)
The Honourable David Samuel Horne MacDonald (from June 4, 1979)
The Honourable Lincoln MacCauley Alexander (from June 4, 1979)
The Honourable Roch LaSalle (from June 4, 1979)
The Right Honourable Donald Frank Mazankowski (from June 4, 1979)
The Honourable Elmer MacIntosh MacKay (from June 4, 1979)
The Honourable Arthur Jacob Epp (from June 4, 1979)
The Honourable John Allen Fraser (from June 4, 1979)
The Honourable William H. Jarvis (from June 4, 1979)
The Honourable Allan Bruce McKinnon (from June 4, 1979)
The Honourable Sinclair McKnight Stevens (from June 4, 1979)
The Honourable John Wise (from June 4, 1979)
The Honourable Ronald George Atkey (from June 4, 1979)
The Right Honourable Ramon John Hnatyshyn (from June 4, 1979)
The Honourable David Edward Crombie (from June 4, 1979)
The Honourable Robert René de Cotret (from June 4, 1979)
The Honourable William Heward Grafftey (from June 4, 1979)
The Honourable Henry Perrin Beatty (from June 4, 1979)
The Honourable J. Robert Howie (from June 4, 1979)
The Honourable Steven Eugene Paproski (from June 4, 1979)
The Honourable Arthur Ronald Huntington (from June 4, 1979)
The Honourable Michael Holcombe Wilson (from June 4, 1979)
The Honourable Renaude Lapointe (from November 30, 1979)
The Honourable Stanley Howard Knowles (from November 30, 1979)

P. E. Trudeau
The Honourable Hazen Robert Argue (from March 3, 1980)
The Honourable Gerald Regan (from March 3, 1980)
The Honourable Mark R. MacGuigan (from March 3, 1980)
The Honourable Robert Phillip Kaplan (from March 3, 1980)
The Honourable James Sydney Clark Fleming (from March 3, 1980)
The Honourable William H. Rompkey (from March 3, 1980)
The Honourable Pierre Bussières (from March 3, 1980)
The Honourable Charles Lapointe (from March 3, 1980)
The Honourable Edward C. Lumley (from March 3, 1980)
The Honourable Yvon Pinard (from March 3, 1980)
The Honourable Donald James Johnston (from March 3, 1980)
The Honourable Lloyd Axworthy (from March 3, 1980)
The Honourable Paul James Cosgrove (from March 3, 1980)
The Honourable Judy Erola (from March 3, 1980)
The Honourable James Jerome (from February 16, 1981)
The Honourable Allister Grosart (from February 16, 1981)
The Honourable Jacob Austin (from September 22, 1981)
The Honourable Charles L. Caccia (from September 22, 1981)
The Honourable Serge Joyal (from September 22, 1981)
The Honourable W. Bennett Campbell (from September 22, 1981)
The Honourable Robert Gordon Robertson (from March 2, 1982)
The Honourable John Edward Broadbent (from April 17, 1982)
The Honourable Richard Bennett Hatfield (from April 17, 1982)
The Honourable William Grenville Davis (from April 17, 1982)
The Honourable Allan Emrys Blakeney (from April 17, 1982)
The Honourable E. Peter Lougheed (from April 17, 1982)
The Honourable William Richards Bennett (from April 17, 1982)
The Honourable John MacLennan Buchanan (from April 17, 1982)
The Honourable Alfred Brian Peckford (from April 17, 1982)
The Honourable James Matthew Lee (from April 17, 1982)
The Honourable Howard Russell Pawley (from April 17, 1982)
The Honourable Sterling Rufus Lyon (from April 17, 1982)
The Honourable David Michael Collenette (from August 12, 1983)
The Honourable Céline Hervieux-Payette (from August 12, 1983)
The Honourable Roger Simmons (from August 12, 1983)
The Honourable David Paul Smith (from August 12, 1983)
The Honourable Roy MacLaren (from August 17, 1983)
The Honourable Joseph Mario Jacques Olivier (from January 10, 1984)
The Right Honourable Robert George Brian Dickson (from April 19, 1984)
The Honourable Robert B. Bryce (from April 19, 1984)
The Honourable Peter Michael Pitfield (from April 19, 1984)
The Right Honourable Martin Brian Mulroney (from May 7, 1984)
The Right Honourable Edward Richard Schreyer (from June 3, 1984)

Turner
The Honourable Herb Breau (from June 30, 1984)
The Honourable Joseph Roger Rémi Bujold (from June 30, 1984)
The Honourable Jean-C. Lapierre (from June 30, 1984)
The Honourable Ralph Ferguson (from June 30, 1984)
The Honourable Douglas Cockburn Frith (from June 30, 1984)

Mulroney
The Honourable Robert Carman Coates (from September 17, 1984)
The Honourable Jack Burnett Murta (from September 17, 1984)
The Honourable Harvie Andre (from September 17, 1984)
The Honourable Otto John Jelinek (from September 17, 1984)
The Honourable Thomas Edward Siddon (from September 17, 1984)
The Honourable Charles James Mayer (from September 17, 1984)
The Honourable William Hunter McKnight (from September 17, 1984)
The Honourable Reverend Walter Franklin McLean September 17, 1984
The Honourable Thomas McMillan (from September 17, 1984)
The Honourable Patricia Carney (from September 17, 1984)
The Honourable André Bissonnette (from September 17, 1984)
The Honourable Suzanne Blais-Grenier (from September 17, 1984)
The Honourable Benoît Bouchard (from September 17, 1984)
The Honourable Andrée Champagne (from September 17, 1984)
The Honourable Michel Côté (from September 17, 1984)
The Honourable James Francis Kelleher (from September 17, 1984)
The Honourable Robert E. J. Layton (from September 17, 1984)
The Honourable Marcel Masse (from September 17, 1984)
The Honourable Barbara Jean McDougall (from September 17, 1984)
The Honourable Gerald Merrithew (from September 17, 1984)
The Honourable Monique Vézina (from September 17, 1984)
The Honourable Thomas Clement Douglas (from November 30, 1984)
The Honourable Maurice Riel (from November 30, 1984)
The Honourable Cyril Lloyd Francis (from November 30, 1984)
The Honourable Saul Mark Cherniack (from November 30, 1984)
The Honourable Paule Gauthier (from November 30, 1984)
The Honourable Eugene Alfred Forsey (from June 10, 1985)
The Honourable Lloyd Roseville Crouse (from June 10, 1985)
The Honourable Stewart Donald McInnes (from August 20, 1985)
The Honourable Frank Oberle (from November 20, 1985)
The Honourable Gordon Francis Joseph Osbaldeston (from February 13, 1986)
The Honourable Lowell Murray (from June 30, 1986)
The Honourable Paul Wyatt Dick (from June 30, 1986)
The Honourable Pierre H. Cadieux (from June 30, 1986)
The Honourable Jean J. Charest (from June 30, 1986)
The Honourable Thomas Hockin (from June 30, 1986)
The Honourable Monique Landry (from June 30, 1986)
The Honourable Bernard Valcourt (from June 30, 1986)
The Honourable Gerry Weiner (from June 30, 1986)
The Honourable John William Bosley (from June 30, 1986)
The Honourable Douglas Grinslade Lewis (from August 27, 1987)
The Honourable Pierre Blais (from August 27, 1987)
The Honourable Gerry St. Germain (from March 31, 1988)
The Honourable Lucien Bouchard (from March 31, 1988)
The Honourable John Horton McDermid (from September 15, 1988)
The Honourable Shirley Martin (from September 15, 1988)
The Honourable Mary Collins (from January 30, 1989)
The Honourable Alan Redway (from January 30, 1989)
The Honourable William Charles Winegard (from January 30, 1989)
The Right Honourable A. Kim Campbell (from January 30, 1989)
The Honourable Jean Corbeil (from January 30, 1989)
The Honourable Gilles Loiselle (from January 30, 1989)
The Honourable John White Hughes Bassett (from November 30, 1989)
The Honourable Marcel Danis (from February 23, 1990)
The Honourable David Arnold Croll (from March 21, 1990)
The Right Honourable Joseph Antonio Charles Lamer (from July 3, 1990)
The Honourable Audrey McLaughlin (from January 10, 1991)
The Honourable Pauline Browes (from April 21, 1991)
The Honourable Edmond Jacques Courtois (from December 5, 1991)
The Honourable J. J. Michel Robert (from December 5, 1991)
The Honourable Marcel Prud'homme (from July 1, 1992)
The Honourable William C. Scott (from July 1, 1992)
The Honourable Lorne Edmund Nystrom (from July 1, 1992)
The Honourable Gerhard Herzberg (from July 1, 1992)
The Honourable Arthur Tremblay (from July 1, 1992)
The Honourable David Alexander Colville (from July 1, 1992)
The Honourable Pauline Jewett (from July 1, 1992)
The Honourable Paul Desmarais (from July 1, 1992)
The Honourable John Charles Polanyi (from July 1, 1992)
The Honourable Maurice F. Strong (from July 1, 1992)
The Honourable Antonine Maillet (from July 1, 1992)
The Honourable Rita Joe (from July 1, 1992)
The Honourable James Bourque (from July 1, 1992)
The Honourable Richard Cashin (from July 1, 1992)
The Honourable Paul M. Tellier (from July 1, 1992)
The Honourable Patricia Helen Rogers (from July 1, 1992)
The Honourable David Robert Peterson (from July 1, 1992)
The Honourable Conrad M. Black (from July 1, 1992; expelled January 31, 2014) 
The Honourable Charles Rosner Bronfman (from October 21, 1992)
The Honourable Maurice Richard (from October 30, 1992)
The Honourable William Ormond Mitchell (from November 5, 1992)
The Honourable Edwin A. Goodman (from November 30, 1992)
The Honourable George W. Vari (from December 23, 1992)
The Honourable Pierre H. Vincent (from January 4, 1993)
The Honourable Rosemary Brown (from April 20, 1993)

Campbell
The Honourable Jim Edwards (from June 25, 1993)
The Honourable Robert Douglas Nicholson (from June 25, 1993)
The Honourable Barbara Jane Sparrow (from June 25, 1993)
The Honourable Peter L. McCreath (from June 25, 1993)
The Honourable Ian Angus Ross Reid (from June 25, 1993)
The Honourable Larry Schneider (from June 25, 1993)
The Honourable Garth Turner (from June 25, 1993)

Chrétien
The Honourable David Anderson (from November 4, 1993)
The Honourable Ralph E. Goodale (from November 4, 1993)
The Honourable David Charles Dingwall (from November 4, 1993)
The Honourable Ron Irwin (from November 4, 1993)
The Honourable Brian Tobin (from November 4, 1993)
The Honourable Joyce Fairbairn (from November 4, 1993)
The Honourable Sheila Maureen Copps (from November 4, 1993)
The Honourable Sergio Marchi (from November 4, 1993)
The Honourable John Manley (from November 4, 1993)
The Honourable Diane Marleau (from November 4, 1993)
The Right Honourable Paul Martin (from November 4, 1993)
The Honourable Douglas Young (from November 4, 1993)
The Honourable Michel Dupuy (from November 4, 1993)
The Honourable Arthur C. Eggleton (from November 4, 1993)
The Honourable Marcel Massé (from November 4, 1993)
The Honourable Anne McLellan (from November 4, 1993)
The Honourable Allan Rock (from November 4, 1993)
The Honourable Sheila Finestone (from November 4, 1993)
The Honourable Fernand Robichaud (from November 4, 1993)
The Honourable Ethel Blondin-Andrew (from November 4, 1993)
The Honourable Lawrence MacAulay (from November 4, 1993)
The Honourable Christine Stewart (from November 4, 1993)
The Honourable Raymond Chan (from November 4, 1993)
The Honourable Jon Gerrard (from November 4, 1993)
The Honourable Douglas Peters (from November 4, 1993)
The Honourable Alfonso Gagliano (from September 15, 1994)
The Honourable Lucienne Robillard (from February 22, 1995)
The Honourable Fred J. Mifflin (from January 25, 1996)
The Honourable Jane Stewart (from January 25, 1996)
The Honourable Stéphane Dion (from January 25, 1996)
The Honourable Pierre Pettigrew (from January 25, 1996)
The Honourable Martin Cauchon (from January 25, 1996)
The Honourable Hedy Fry (from January 25, 1996)
The Honourable James Andrew Grant (from September 30, 1996)
The Honourable Don Boudria (from October 4, 1996)
The Honourable Guy Charbonneau (from October 17, 1996)
The Honourable Bernard Alasdair Graham (from June 11, 1997)
The Honourable Lyle Vanclief (from June 11, 1997)
The Honourable Herb Dhaliwal (from June 11, 1997)
The Honourable Andy Scott (from June 11, 1997)
The Honourable David Kilgour (from June 11, 1997)
The Honourable James Scott Peterson (from June 11, 1997)
The Honourable Ronald J. Duhamel (from June 11, 1997)
The Honourable Andrew Mitchell (from June 11, 1997)
The Honourable Gilbert Normand (from June 18, 1997)
The Honourable Robert Keith Rae (from April 30, 1998)
The Honourable Claudette Bradshaw (from November 23, 1998)
The Honourable Jocelyne Bourgon (from December 14, 1998)
The Honourable Raymond A. Speaker (from June 9, 1999)
The Honourable Frank Joseph McKenna (from June 9, 1999)
The Honourable George Baker (from August 3, 1999)
The Honourable Robert Daniel Nault (from August 3, 1999)
The Honourable Maria Minna (from August 3, 1999)
The Honourable Elinor Caplan (from August 3, 1999)
The Honourable Denis Coderre (from August 3, 1999)
The Honourable J. Bernard Boudreau (from October 4, 1999)
The Right Honourable Beverley M. McLachlin (from January 12, 2000)
The Honourable Sharon Carstairs (from January 9, 2001)
The Honourable Robert G. Thibault (from January 9, 2001)
The Honourable Rey Pagtakhan (from January 9, 2001)
The Honourable Gilbert Parent (from June 5, 2001)
The Honourable Gary Albert Filmon (from October 4, 2001)
The Honourable Susan Whelan (from January 15, 2002)
The Honourable Maurizio Bevilacqua (from January 15, 2002)
The Honourable Paul DeVillers (from January 15, 2002)
The Honourable Gar Knutson (from January 15, 2002)
The Honourable Denis Paradis (from January 15, 2002)
The Honourable Claude Drouin (from January 15, 2002)
The Honourable John McCallum (from January 15, 2002)
The Honourable Stephen Owen (from January 15, 2002)
The Honourable William Graham (from January 15, 2002)
The Honourable Gerry Byrne (from January 15, 2002)
The Honourable Jean Augustine (from May 26, 2002)
The Honourable Arnold Wayne Easter (from October 22, 2002)
The Honourable Baljit Singh Chadha (from February 20, 2003)
The Honourable Steven W. Mahoney (from April 11, 2003)
The Honourable Roy J. Romanow (from November 13, 2003)

Martin
The Honourable Albina Guarnieri (from December 12, 2003)
The Honourable Stanley Kazmierczak Keyes (from December 12, 2003)
The Honourable Joseph McGuire (from December 12, 2003)
The Honourable Robert Speller (from December 12, 2003)
The Honourable Reginald B. Alcock (from December 12, 2003)
The Honourable Geoff Regan (from December 12, 2003)
The Honourable Tony Valeri (from December 12, 2003)
The Honourable M. Aileen Carroll (from December 12, 2003)
The Honourable David Pratt (from December 12, 2003)
The Honourable Irwin Cotler (from December 12, 2003)
The Honourable Judy Sgro (from December 12, 2003)
The Honourable Hélène Chalifour Scherrer (from 	December 12, 2003)
The Honourable Ruben John Efford (from December 12, 2003)
The Honourable Liza Frulla (from December 12, 2003)
The Honourable Joseph Robert Comuzzi (from December 12, 2003)
The Honourable Giuseppe (Joseph) Volpe (from December 12, 2003)
The Honourable Mauril Bélanger (from December 12, 2003)
The Honourable Carolyn Bennett (from December 12, 2003)
The Honourable Jacques Saada (from 	December 12, 2003)
The Honourable Joseph Frank Fontana (from December 12, 2003)
The Honourable John Ferguson Godfrey (from December 12, 2003)
The Honourable Scott Brison (from December 12, 2003)
The Honourable Serge Marcil (from December 12, 2003)
The Honourable John McKay (from December 12, 2003)
The Honourable Jerry Pickard (from December 12, 2003)
The Honourable Yvon Charbonneau (from December 12, 2003)
The Honourable Gurbax Singh Malhi (from December 12, 2003)
The Honourable John Harvard (from December 12, 2003)
The Honourable Larry Bagnell (from 	December 12, 2003)
The Honourable Brenda Kay Chamberlain (from December 12, 2003)
The Honourable Walt Lastewka (from December 12, 2003)
The Honourable Dan McTeague (from December 12, 2003)
The Honourable Mark Eyking (from December 12, 2003)
The Honourable Georges Farrah (from December 12, 2003)
The Honourable Eleni Bakopanos (from December 12, 2003)
The Honourable Paul Bonwick (from 	December 12, 2003)
The Honourable Joe Jordan (from December 12, 2003)
The Honourable Shawn Murphy (from December 12, 2003)
The Honourable Jim Karygiannis (from December 12, 2003)
The Honourable David Price (from December 12, 2003)
The Honourable Roger Gallaway (from 	December 12, 2003)
The Honourable Susan Barnes (from December 12, 2003)
The Honourable André Harvey (from 	December 12, 2003)
The Honourable Andrew Telegdi (from 	January 30, 2004)
The Honourable Rev. William Alexander Blaikie 	(from February 19, 2004)
The Honourable Grant Hill (from February 19, 2004)
The Right Honourable Stephen Joseph Harper (from May 4, 2004)
The Honourable Joseph Mario Jacques Olivier (from May 5, 2004)
The Honourable Peter Adams (from July 20, 2004)
The Honourable Sarmite Bulte (from July 20, 2004)
The Honourable Roy Cullen (from July 20, 2004)
The Honourable Ujjal Dosanjh (from July 20, 2004)
The Honourable Ken Dryden (from July 20, 2004)
The Honourable David Emerson (from July 20, 2004)
The Honourable Tony Ianno (from July 20, 2004)
The Honourable Marlene Jennings (from July 20, 2004)
The Honourable Dominic LeBlanc (from July 20, 2004)
The Honourable Judi Longfield (from July 20, 2004)
The Honourable Paul Macklin (from July 20, 2004)
The Honourable Keith P. Martin (from July 20, 2004)
The Honourable Karen Redman (from July 20, 2004)
The Honourable Raymond Simard (from July 20, 2004)
The Honourable Patricia Anne Torsney (from July 20, 2004)
The Honourable Bryon Wilfert (from 	July 20, 2004)
The Honourable Jack Gilbert Layton (from March 21, 2005)
The Honourable Belinda Stronach (from May 17, 2005)
The Honourable Aldéa Landry, Q.C. 	(from June 24, 2005)
The Right Honourable Adrienne Clarkson (from October 3, 2005)
The Honourable Navdeep Bains (from 	October 7, 2005)
The Honourable Charles Hubbard (from October 7, 2005)
The Honourable Anita Neville (from October 18, 2005)

Notes

References

See also
List of current members of the Queen's Privy Council for Canada
List of members of the Privy Council for Canada (1867–1911)
List of members of the Privy Council for Canada (1911–1948)
List of members of the Privy Council for Canada (1948–1968)
List of members of the Privy Council for Canada (2006–present)

1968-2005